The Communist Party of Slovakia (KSS) is a communist party in Slovakia, formed in 1992, through the merger of the Communist Party of Slovakia – 91 and the Communist League of Slovakia.

The party is observer of the Party of the European Left although it criticizes the Political Theses for the 1st Congress of European Left. For the 2019 European Parliament  election the KSS formed a unity list together with VZDOR – strana práce. The list was called Socialistický Front. It received 0.62% of the votes.

Electoral results

See also
Communist Party of Slovakia (1939)
Communist Party of Czechoslovakia
Communist Party of Bohemia and Moravia
Politics of Slovakia
List of political parties in Slovakia

References

External links 
 

1992 establishments in Slovakia
Communist parties in Slovakia
Far-left political parties
Party of the European Left observer parties
Political history of Slovakia
Political parties established in 1992
Political parties in Czechoslovakia
International Meeting of Communist and Workers Parties